OSN News is a 24-hour satellite channel offering exclusively American news programming from NBC, and MSNBC to U.S. expatriates, primarily geared towards an audience in the Arab countries. The channel is available on OSN Network in Middle East and North Africa.

Background
OSN News offers live coverage from major U.S. news networks and Canada news networks such as NBC and MSNBC such as NBC's Today are followed by news magazine programs, documentaries, and financial shows. World, business, technology and entertainment news and weather from MSNBC is also offered.

OSN News is broadcast by Orbit Showtime Network, a major pay television service in the Middle East and North Africa. In 2009 two new channels were launched, Orbit News 2 and Orbit News 3, offering extended coverage of American news from MSNBC and NBC. These two services were taken off air during the fall 2010 at the same time the main channel changed names from Orbit News to OSN News.

ABC, NBC and MSNBC shows on OSN News

OSN News Logos

See also
OSN
OSN Movies
OSN Sports

External links
 OSN TV Channels

24-hour television news channels
NBC News
MSNBC